Democratic Party may refer to:

Democratic Party (Japan, 1947)
Democratic Party (Japan, 1996), commonly abbreviated as DPJ
Democratic Party (Japan, 1998), commonly abbreviated as DPJ
Democratic Party (Japan, 2016), commonly abbreviated as DP
Constitutional Democratic Party of Japan (2017–), commonly abbreviated as CDP or CDPJ
Democratic Party for the People (2018–), commonly abbreviated as DPFP or DPP
Japan Democratic Party, commonly abbreviated as JDP